Heribert Blens is a German politician of the Christian Democratic Union (CDU) and former member of the German Bundestag.

Life 
Blens became a member of the CDU as early as 1955, and from 1969 to 1987 he was a member of the Cologne City Council. He was also one of the mayors of Cologne from 1975 to 1987. Blens has a doctorate in law. After working at the administrative courts in Cologne and Düsseldorf, he was a member of the German Bundestag from 1983 to 2002.

References

External links 

1936 births
Living people
Members of the Bundestag for North Rhine-Westphalia
Members of the Bundestag 1998–2002
Members of the Bundestag 1994–1998
Members of the Bundestag 1990–1994
Members of the Bundestag 1987–1990
Members of the Bundestag 1983–1987
Members of the Bundestag for the Christian Democratic Union of Germany